Spider toxins are a family of proteins produced by spiders which function as neurotoxins. The mechanism of many spider toxins is through blockage of calcium channels.

A remotely related group of atracotoxins operate by opening sodium channels. Delta atracotoxin from the venom of the Sydney funnel-web spider produces potentially fatal neurotoxic symptoms in primates by slowing the inactivation of voltage-gated sodium channels. The structure of atracotoxin comprises a core beta region containing a triple-stranded a thumb-like extension protruding from the beta region and a C-terminal helix. The beta region contains a cystine knot motif, a feature seen in other neurotoxic polypeptides and other spider toxins, of the CSTX family.

Spider potassium channel inhibitory toxins is another group of spider toxins. A representative of this group is hanatoxin, a 35 amino acid peptide toxin which was isolated from Chilean rose tarantula (Grammostola rosea, syn. G. spatulata) venom. It inhibits the drk1 voltage-gated potassium channel by altering the energetics of gating. See also Huwentoxin-1.

See also
 Raventoxin

References

Further reading

 

Protein domains

Peripheral membrane proteins